The News & Documentary Emmy Awards, or News & Documentary Emmys, are part of the extensive range of Emmy Awards for artistic and technical merit for the American television industry. Bestowed by the National Academy of Television Arts and Sciences (NATAS), the News & Documentary Emmys are presented in recognition of excellence in American news and documentary programming.

Ceremonies generally are held in the fall, with the Emmys handed out in about 40 awards categories. Only two of these award categories honor local news programming, while the rest are for national programming. Most Emmys for local news and documentary programming are instead awarded during the Regional Emmys.

Before the News & Documentary Emmy Awards, news and documentary were categories at the Primetime Emmy Awards until 1975.

Rules
According to the News & Documentary Emmy rules, a show, documentary or news report must originally air on American television during the eligibility period between January 1 and December 31, and to at least 50 percent of the country. A foreign-produced show is usually ineligible unless it was a co-production with an American partner, and was originally committed to be aired on American television right from the start.

For the two award categories that honor local news programming, Outstanding Regional Story: Spot News and Outstanding Regional Story: Investigative Reporting, only news reports that have already won a Regional Emmy are eligible.

Entries must be submitted by March. Most award categories also require entries to include DVDs or tape masters of the show, documentary or news report. For the New Approaches categories, the video or multimedia is submitted online. In addition, a one-page essay describing why an entry is "Emmy-worthy" is also required.

Voting is done by peer judging panels between May and June. The Academy solicits anybody with significant experience in national news or documentary reporting or production to serve as judges. Most categories have two voting rounds, with separate judging panels in each round. The top entries in each category are announced as the "nominations", and then the top entry is announced as the Emmy winner later at the awards ceremony.

Award categories

National
 Regularly Scheduled Newscast
 Outstanding Coverage of a Breaking News Story
 Outstanding Continuing Coverage of a News Story
 Outstanding Feature Story
 Outstanding Investigative Journalism
 Outstanding Business and Economic Reporting
 News Magazine
 Outstanding Coverage of a Breaking News Story
 Outstanding Continuing Coverage of a News Story
 Outstanding Feature Story
 Outstanding Investigative Journalism
 Outstanding Business and Economic Reporting
 Long Form
 Outstanding Live Coverage of a Current News Story
 Outstanding Continuing Coverage of a News Story
 Outstanding Investigative Journalism
 Outstanding Informational Programming
 Outstanding Historical Programming
 Outstanding Business and Economic Reporting
 Outstanding Programming
 Arts and Culture
 Science and Technology
 Nature
 Outstanding Interview
 Best Story in a Regularly Scheduled Newscast
 Best Report in a News Magazine
 Best Documentary
 New Approaches To News & Documentary Programming:
 Current News Coverage
 Documentaries
 Arts, Lifestyle & Culture
 Outstanding Individual Achievement in a Craft:
 Writing
 Research
 Cinematography - Nature
 Cinematography - News Coverage / Documentaries
 Editing
 Editing–Quick Turnaround
 Graphic Design & Art  Direction
 Music & Sound
 Lighting Direction & Scenic Design
 Outstanding Promotional Announcement:
 Institutional
 Episodic

Regional
 Outstanding Regional News Story:
 Spot News
 Investigative Reporting

See also

 List of American television awards

References

External links

News & Documentary Emmy Award Nominees and Winners 1979-2015

Emmy Awards

American journalism awards